The Christian Agricultural Workers and Craftsmen Party (KFIP) was a political party in Hungary during the early 1920s.

History
The party first contested national elections in 1922, winning a single seat in the parliamentary elections that year.

After 1922 the party did not contest any further elections.

References

Defunct political parties in Hungary
Christian political parties in Hungary